The 1995 NCAA Division I Men's Swimming and Diving Championships were contested in March 1995 at the Indiana University Natatorium in Indianapolis, Indiana at the 72nd annual NCAA-sanctioned swim meet to determine the team and individual national champions of Division I men's collegiate swimming and diving in the United States.

Michigan topped the team standings, finishing 86 points ahead of three-time defending champions Stanford. It was the Wolverines' eleventh title but their first since 1961. It was the first title for coach Jon Urbanchek.

Team standings
Note: Top 10 only
(H) = Hosts
(DC) = Defending champions
Full results

See also
List of college swimming and diving teams

References

NCAA Division I Men's Swimming and Diving Championships
NCAA Division I Swimming And Diving Championships
NCAA Division I Men's Swimming And Diving Championships
NCAA Division I Men's Swimming and Diving Championships